The Rose Realty-Securities Building is a historic six-story building in Omaha, Nebraska. It was built by John H. Harte for the Rose Realty Company in 1916, and designed in Chicago school style by architect Frederick A. Henninger. The first floor was used for stores while the upper floors were rented as offices. The corner of 16th and Farnam was a Union Pacific ticket office from 1917 to 1941. The building has been listed on the National Register of Historic Places since July 19, 1996.

References

External links

National Register of Historic Places in Omaha, Nebraska
Chicago school architecture in the United States
Commercial buildings completed in 1916
1916 establishments in Nebraska